The 2006 Blaupunkt SEAT Cupra Championship season was the fourth season of the SEAT Cupra Championship. It began on 9 April at Brands Hatch, and ended on 15 October at Silverstone, after eighteen rounds held in England and Scotland. The championship was dominated by the previous season's runner-up Mat Jackson, who won eleven of the eighteen rounds. He would use the £100,000 prize for winning the championship to purchase the ex-Andy Priaulx World Touring Car Championship-winning BMW 320si for the 2007 British Touring Car Championship season. Alan Blencowe was second with 225 points, with Jonathan Adam in third with 218 points, Fulvio Mussi in fourth with 169 points and Ben Winrow in fifth with 166 points.

Teams and drivers
All entries ran the Mk1 SEAT León.

Calendar

Championship Standings
 Points were awarded as follows:

External links
 2006 season results on the SEAT Sport UK website

SEAT Cupra Championship
SEAT Cupra Championship seasons